Laura Šimenc (born 25 July 1990) is a Slovenian professional racing cyclist. She rides for the No Radunion Vitalogic team.

See also
 List of 2015 UCI Women's Teams and riders

References

External links

1990 births
Living people
Slovenian female cyclists
Place of birth missing (living people)